Cobalt(II) formate is an inorganic compound with the chemical formula Co(HCO2)2 (or Co(HCOO)2).

It is used in the preparation of cobalt catalysts.

References

Cobalt(II) compounds
Formates